Guatitas ([little] guts or [little] bellies, from ; "Gut/Belly"), or guatitas criollas, is a popular dish in Ecuador, where it is considered a national dish, and in Chile,  It is essentially a stew whose main ingredient is pieces of tripe (cow stomach), known locally as "guatitas". The tripe is often cleaned several times in a lemon-juice brine, after which it is cooked for a long time until the meat is tender. Then it is allowed to cool and finely chopped. There are various vegetarian versions of the dish in which wheat gluten is substituted for tripe. Other variations use strong-tasting fish such as tuna. The traditional Ecuadorian recipe is served hot and accompanied by potatoes and a peanut sauce.

The dish is often considered an acquired taste. Because of its strong taste, it is sometimes served in small quantities.

In Ecuador, it is believed that guatita helps relieve hangover symptoms. For this reason, it is often served by restaurants early on Saturday and Sunday mornings.

Related dishes

 Mexico: Pancita, mondongo
 Colombia: Mondongo antioqueño
 Peru: Cau Cau a la limeña
 Panama: Mondongo a la culona
 Chile: Chupe de guatitas, guatitas a la jardinera
 Argentina: Mondongo rioplatense
 Paraguay: Seco de mondongo
 Ecuador: Caldo de mondongo
 Spain: Callos
 Dominican Republic: Mondongo

See also

 List of Ecuadorian dishes and foods
 List of stews

References

Ecuadorian cuisine
Chilean cuisine
Stews
Offal
Beef dishes
National dishes